Capital is a name for several high schools, generally found in state capital cities. These include:

Capital High School, Bhubaneswar, Orissa, India
Capital High School (Boise, Idaho)
Capital High School (Charleston, West Virginia)
Capital High School (Helena, Montana)
Capital High School (Olympia, Washington)
Capital High School (Santa Fe, New Mexico)
Capital High School (Jefferson City, Missouri)

See also 
 Capitol High School (disambiguation)